Brek may refer to:

Brek Shea, American soccer player
Ready Brek, an oat-based breakfast cereal
Polar Boy (aka "Brek Bannin"), DC Comics character